The Brinksway Caves, also known as Maggie's Caves, are a group of artificial caves located in Brinksway, by the River Mersey in Stockport.

The caves were excavated by workers chipping away at naturally eroding sandstone on the Cheadle side of the River Mersey.

History

Toponymy 
The Brinksway Caves take their name from Brinksway, a nearby road which stretches a small portion of the A560 road. The road itself takes its name from the Middle English brink, an edge or bank, and the Old English weg, a path; hence, a road at a brink.

Early history 
The caves date back to at least 1670, possibly excavated by workers from the local corn mill tunnels or by the river wideners, both of whom had the tools and experience to construct these caves. The caves are also believed to have been constructed by navvies working on the Stockport Viaduct, though it is likely that this was an expansion of pre-existing minor cave network. The caves functioned as a residence for the workers, as they were unable to acquire lodging due to poor pay.

Following the construction of the viaduct, the caves began to be used for industrial purposes, with an 1881 query to the Stockport Advertiser noting that they had been used as a manufactory for 30 years. In 1851, the caves were used as a distillery for purifying gas tar to produce naphtha. A pipe-maker was also known to work in the caves.

Contemporary history 
Shortly before the Second World War in 1938, sections of the caves were excavated to construct air raid shelters, the first of which opened on 28 October 1939. As the threat of bombing has subsided by 1943, the shelters were no longer open every night. The shelters were sealed off from the public in 1948.

In the present day, the caves are mostly used as a shelter by homeless people, with up to four at a time. Due to the dangerous location of the caves, several residents have fallen into the river below. In 2015, a woman broke her spine after a 30-foot fall, requiring a rescue from specialist firefighters.

See also 
Stockport Air Raid Shelters
Stockport Viaduct

References 

Subterranea of the United Kingdom
Caves of England